The R540 is a Regional Route in South Africa.

Route
Its southwestern origin is from the R33 in Belfast, Mpumalanga. It heads north-east, through the town of Dullstroom, to reach the southern part of Mashishing (Lydenburg), where it meets the eastern terminus of the R577 before ending at an intersection with the R36.

There is also a 22-kilometre road in Mogale City Local Municipality, West Rand District Municipality, Gauteng that is designated as the R540. It starts at an intersection with the R512 Road just north of the border with Lanseria International Airport, City of Johannesburg Metropolitan Municipality and goes west to meet the northern terminus of the M5 Road of Johannesburg, before turning south-west and ending at an intersection with the N14 National Route north of the city of Krugersdorp.

References

Regional Routes in Mpumalanga